Such is Madrid (Spanish: Así es Madrid) is a 1953 Spanish comedy film directed by Luis Marquina and starring Susana Canales, José Suárez and Manolo Morán.

Cast
 Susana Canales as Eulalia  
 José Suárez as Antonio  
 Manolo Morán as Julián  
 Julia Caba Alba as Carmen  
 José Isbert as Dimas  
 Lina Canalejas as Luisa  
 Rafael Arcos as Mariano  
 Irene Caba Alba as Sabina  
 Gaspar Campos as Illecas  
 Milagros Leal as Regina  
 Ricardo Canales as Damián  
 Antonio Riquelme as Peluquero  
 José Orjas as Ramón  
 Amparo Soler Leal as Pitita  
 Juan Antonio Riquelme as Sindulfo  
 Aurora de Alba as Cantaora  
 Francisco Bernal as Portero  
 Julia Pachelo as Mujer de Baldomero  
 Arturo Marín as Policía  
 Emilio Santiago as Baldomero 
 María Francés as Vecina  
 Manuel Guitián as Tabernero 
 Josefina Serratosa as Portera  
 Fernando Nogueras as Paco 
 Antonio Molino Rojo as Bailarín

References

Bibliography 
 Bentley, Bernard. A Companion to Spanish Cinema. Boydell & Brewer 2008.

External links 
 

1953 comedy films
Spanish comedy films
1953 films
1950s Spanish-language films
Films based on works by Carlos Arniches
Films directed by Luis Marquina
Films set in Madrid
Cifesa films
Spanish black-and-white films
1950s Spanish films